Vrbov (German: Menhardsdorf) is a village and municipality in the Kežmarok District in the Prešov Region of Slovakia.

History
The first surviving mention was in a charter from 1251, when the Slavic village of Werbew was noted in a description of boundaries. In 1268, the German village "villa Menhardi" was noted. The two villages merged around 1271 and the resulting small town had a German character till 1945 when the German population was expelled.

Economy and infrastructure
Vrbov is a big village with touristic infrastructure. There are several accommodation facilities including pensions and camping site. Cultural sightseeings are classical evangelical and gothic Catholic churches as well as renaissance belfry from 17th century.

References

Menhard/Vrbov: Ein Dorf in der Oberzips. Ivan Chalupecky & kol. Kezmarok: Vivit 2005.

External links

http://vrbov.e-obce.sk
http://obecvrbov.sk

Villages and municipalities in Kežmarok District